The Nawab of Bengal was the hereditary ruler of Bengal Subah in Mughal India. In the early 18th-century, the Nawab of Bengal was the de facto independent ruler of the three regions of Bengal, Bihar, and Orissa which constitute the modern-day sovereign country of Bangladesh and the Indian states of West Bengal, Bihar and Orissa. They are often referred to as the Nawab of Bengal, Bihar and Orissa. The Nawabs were based in Murshidabad which was centrally located within Bengal, Bihar, and Odisha. Their chief, a former prime minister, became the first Nawab. The Nawabs continued to issue coins in the name of the Mughal Emperor, but for all practical purposes, the Nawabs governed as independent monarchs. Bengal continued to contribute the largest share of funds to the imperial treasury in Delhi. The Nawabs, backed by bankers such as the Jagat Seth, became the financial backbone of the Mughal court. During the 18th century, the Nawabs of Bengal were among the wealthiest rulers in the world.

The Nawabs, especially under the rule of Alivardi Khan of 16 years, was heavily engaged in various wars against the Marathas. Towards the end, he turned his attention to rebuilding and restoring Bengal.

The Nawabs of Bengal oversaw a period of proto-industrialization. The Bengal-Bihar-Orissa triangle was a major production center for cotton muslin cloth, silk cloth, shipbuilding, gunpowder, saltpetre, and metalworks. Factories were set up in Murshidabad, Dhaka, Patna, Sonargaon, Chittagong, Rajshahi, Cossimbazar, Balasore, Pipeli, and Hugli among other cities, towns, and ports. The region became a base for the British East India Company, the French East India Company, the Danish East India Company, the Austrian East India Company, the Ostend Company, and the Dutch East India Company.

The British company eventually rivaled the authority of the Nawabs. In the aftermath of the siege of Calcutta in 1756, in which the Nawab's forces overran the main British base, the East India Company dispatched a fleet led by Robert Clive who defeated the last independent Nawab Siraj-ud-Daulah at the Battle of Plassey in 1757. Mir Jafar was installed as the puppet Nawab. His successor Mir Qasim attempted in vain to dislodge the British. The defeat of Nawab Mir Qasim of Bengal, Nawab Shuja-ud-Daula of Oudh, and Mughal Emperor Shah Alam II at the Battle of Buxar in 1764 paved the way for British expansion across India. The South Indian Kingdom of Mysore led by Tipu Sultan overtook the Nawab of Bengal as the subcontinent's wealthiest monarchy; but this was short-lived and ended with the Anglo-Mysore War. The British then turned their sights on defeating the Marathas and Sikhs.

In 1772, Governor-General Warren Hastings shifted administrative and judicial offices from Murshidabad to Calcutta, the capital of the newly formed Bengal Presidency, and the de facto capital of British India. The Nawabs had lost all independent authority since 1757. In 1858, the British government abolished the symbolic authority of the Mughal court. After 1880, the descendants of the Nawabs of Bengal were recognised simply as Nawabs of Murshidabad with the mere status of a peerage.

History

Independent nawabs
The Bengal Subah was the wealthiest subah of the Mughal Empire. There were several posts under the Mughal administrative system of Bengal since Akbar's conquest in the 1500s. Nizamat (governornership) and diwani (premiership) were the two main branches of provincial government under the Mughals. The Subahdar was in-charge of the nizamat and had a chain of subordinate officials on the executive side, including diwans (prime ministers) responsible for revenue and legal affairs. The regional decentralization of the Mughal Empire led to the creation of numerous semi-independent strongholds in the Mughal provinces. As the Mughal Empire began to decline, the Nawabs rose in power. By the early 1700s, the Nawabs were practically independent, despite a nominal tribute to the Mughal court.

The Mughal court heavily relied on Bengal for revenue. Azim-us-Shan, the Mughal viceroy of Bengal, had a bitter power struggle with his prime minister (diwan) Murshid Quli Khan. Emperor Aurangzeb transferred Azim-us-Shan out of Bengal as a result of the disputes. After the viceroy's exit, the provincial premier Murshid Quli Khan emerged as the de facto ruler of Bengal. His administrative coup merged the offices of the diwan (prime minister) and subedar (viceroy). In 1716, Khan shifted Bengal's capital from Dhaka to a new city named after himself. In 1717, Mughal Emperor Farrukhsiyar recognized Khan as the hereditary Nawab Nazim. The Nawab's jurisdiction covered districts in Bengal, Bihar, and Orissa. The Nawab's territory stretched from the border with Oudh in the west to the border with Arakan in the east.

The chief deputy of the Nawab was the Naib Nazim of Dhaka, the mayor of the former provincial capital whose own wealth was considerable; the Naib Nazim of Dhaka also governed much of eastern Bengal. Other important officials were stationed in Patna, Cuttack, and Chittagong. The aristocracy was composed of the Zamindars of Bengal. The Nawab was backed up by the powerful Jagat Seth family of bankers and money lenders. The Jagat Seth controlled the flow of Bengali revenue into the imperial treasury in Delhi. They served as financiers to both the Nawabs and European companies operating in the region.

The Nawabs profited from the revenue generated by the worldwide demand of muslin trade in Bengal, which was centered in Dhaka and Sonargaon. Murshidabad was a major center of silk production. Shipbuilding in Chittagong enjoyed Ottoman and European demand. Patna was a center of metalworks and the military-industrial complex. The Bengal-Bihar region was a major exporter of gunpowder and saltpetre. The Nawabs presided over an era of growing organization in banking, handicrafts, and other trades.

Bengal attracted traders from across Eurasia. Traders were lodged at caravanserais, including the Katra Masjid in Murshidabad; and the Bara Katra and Choto Katra in Dhaka. Dutch Bengali trading posts included the main Dutch port of Pipeli in Orissa; the Dutch settlement in Rajshahi; and the towns of Cossimbazar and Hugli. The Danes built trading posts in Bankipur and on islands of the Bay of Bengal. Balasore in Orissa was a prominent Austrian trading post. Bengali cities were full of brokers, workers, peons, naibs, wakils, and ordinary traders.

The Nawabs were patrons of the arts, including the Murshidabad style of Mughal painting, Hindustani classical music, the Baul tradition, and local craftsmanship. The second Nawab Shuja-ud-Din Muhammad Khan developed Murshidabad's royal palace, military base, city gates, revenue office, public audience hall (durbar), and mosques in an extensive compound called Farrabagh (Garden of Joy) which included canals, fountains, flowers, and fruit trees. The second Nawab's reign saw a period of economic and political consolidation.

The third Nawab Sarfaraz Khan was preoccupied with military engagements, including Nader Shah's invasion of India. Sarfaraz Khan was killed at the Battle of Giria by his deputy Alivardi Khan. The coup by Alivardi Khan led to the creation of a new dynasty. Nawab Alivardi Khan endured brutal raids by the Maratha Empire. The Marathas undertook six expeditions in Bengal from 1741–1748. The Maratha general Raghunath Rao conquered large parts of Orissa. Nawab Alivardi Khan made peace with Raghunathrao in 1751, ceding large parts of Orissa up to the river Subarnarekha. The Marathas demanded an annual tribute payment. The Marathas also promised to never to cross the boundary of the Nawab's territory. European trading companies also grew more influential in Bengal.

The Nawabs were also notorious for their repressive tactics, including torture for non-payment of land rent. Nawab Alivardi Khan's successor was Nawab Siraj-ud-Daulah.Nawab Siraj-ud-Daulah grew increasingly wary of the British presence in Bengal. He also feared invasions by the Durrani Empire from the north and Marathas from the west. On 20 June 1756, Nawab Siraj-ud-Daulah launched the siege of Calcutta, in which he won a decisive victory. The British were briefly expelled from Fort William, which came under the occupation of the Nawab's forces. The East India Company dispatched a naval fleet led by Robert Clive to regain control of Fort William. By January 1757, the British retook Fort William. The stalemate with the Nawab continued into June. The Nawab also began cooperating with the French East India Company, raising the ire of the British further. Britain and France were at the time pitted against each other in the Seven Years' War.

On 23 June 1757, the Battle of Plassey brought an end to the independence of the Nawabs of Bengal. Nawab Siraj-ud-Daulah and his French allies were caught off guard by the defection of the Nawab's Commander-in-Chief Mir Jafar to the British side. The British, under the leadership of Robert Clive, gained enormous influence over Bengal Subah as a result of the battle. The last independent Nawab was arrested by his former officers and killed in revenge for the brutality against his courtiers.

British influence and succession
Mir Jafar was installed as the puppet Nawab by the British. However, Jafar entered into a secret treaty with the Dutch East India Company. This caused the British to replace Mir Jafar with his son-in-law Mir Qasim in October 1760. In one of his first acts, Mir Qasim ceded Chittagong, Burdwan and Midnapore to the East India Company. Mir Qasim also proved to be a popular ruler. But Mir Qasim's independent spirit eventually raised British suspicions. Mir Jafar was reinstalled as Nawab in 1763. Mir Qasim continued opposing the British and his father-in-law. He set up his capital in Munger and raised an independent army. Mir Qasim attacked British positions in Patna, overrunning the Company's offices and killing its Resident. Mir Qasim also attacked the British-allied Gorkha Kingdom. Mir Qasim allied with Nawab Shuja-ud-Daula of Awadh and Mughal Emperor Shah Alam II. However, the Mughal allies were defeated at the Battle of Buxar in 1764, which was the last real chance of resisting British expansion across the northern Indian subcontinent.

The South Indian Kingdom of Mysore under Haider Ali and Tipu Sultan briefly eclipsed the dominant position of Bengal in the subcontinent. Tipu Sultan pursued aggressive military modernization; and set up a company to trade with communities around the Persian Gulf and the Arabian Sea. Mysore's military technology at one point rivaled European technology. However, the Anglo-Mysore War ended Tipu Sultan's ascendancy.

In 1765, Robert Clive became the first Governor of Bengal. He secured for the Company the diwani of the Bengal subah in perpetuity, from the Mughal emperor Shah Alam II. With this the system of dual governance was established and the Bengal Presidency was formed. In 1772, this arrangement came to be abolished and Bengal was brought under direct control of the British. In 1793, when the nizamat of the Nawab was also taken away they remained as the mere pensioners of the Company. After the Revolt of 1857, Company rule in India ended, and the British Crown, in 1858, took over the territories which were under direct rule of the Company. This marked the beginning of the British Raj, and the Nawabs had no political or any other kind of control over the territory. Mir Jafar's descendants continued to live in Murshidabad. The Hazarduari Palace (Palace of a Thousand Doors) was built as the residence of the Nawabs in the 1830s. The palace was also used by British colonial officials.

Nawab Mansur Ali Khan was the last titular Nawab Nazim of Bengal. During his reign the nizamat at Murshidabad came to be debt-ridden. The Nawab left Murshidabad in February 1869, and had started living in England. The title of the Nawab of Bengal stood abolished in 1880. He returned to Bombay in October 1880 and pleaded his case against the orders of the government, but as it stood unresolved the Nawab renounced his styles and titles, abdicating in favour of his eldest son on 1 November 1880.

The Nawabs of Murshidabad succeeded the Nawab Nazims following Nawab Mansur Ali Khan's abdication, The Nawab Bahadurs had ceased to exercise any significant power. but were relegated to the status of a zamindar and continued to be a wealthy family, producing bureaucrats and army officers.

List of Nawabs
The following is a list of the Nawabs of Bengal. Sarfaraz Khan and Mir Jafar were the only two to become Nawab Nazim twice. The chronology started in 1717 with Murshid Quli Khan and ended in 1880 with Mansur Ali Khan.

Nawabs of Bengal under Mughal suzerainty

Nawabs of Bengal under British rule

References

External links

 The arrival of the Nawabs their decline
 History of the Nawabs
 Official posts under the administration of the Nawabs

Nawabs of Bengal
Bengal Subah
Indian nobility
Noble titles created in 1717
1717 establishments in Asia
Murshidabad district